, established on 15 January 1921, is a Japanese multinational electronics and electrical equipment manufacturing company headquartered in Tokyo, Japan. It is one of the core companies of Mitsubishi. The products from MELCO include elevators and escalators, high-end home appliances, air conditioning, factory automation systems, train systems, electric motors, pumps, semiconductors, digital signage, and satellites.

In the United States, products are manufactured and sold by Mitsubishi Electric United States headquartered in Cypress, California.

History
MELCO was established as a spin-off from the Mitsubishi Group's other core company Mitsubishi Heavy Industries, then Mitsubishi Shipbuilding, as the latter divested a marine electric motor factory in Kobe, Nagasaki. It has since diversified to become the major electronics company.

MELCO held the record for the fastest elevator in the world, in the 70-story Yokohama Landmark Tower, from 1993 to 2005.

The company acquired Nihon Kentetsu, a Japanese home appliance manufacturer, in 2005.

In 2015 the company acquired DeLclima, an Italian company that designs and produces HVAC and HPAC units, renamed Mitsubishi Electric Hydronics & IT Cooling Systems SpA in 2017.

In early 2020, MELCO was identified as a victim of the year-long cyberattacks perpetrated by the Chinese hackers.

Products

MELCO is consistently innovative. In 2021, the World Intellectual Property Organization (WIPO)’s annual World Intellectual Property Indicators report ranked Mitsubishi Electric's number of patent applications published under the PCT System as 3rd in the world, with 2,661 patent applications being published during 2020. This position is down from their previous ranking as 2nd in 2019 with 2,334 applications.
Some product lines of MELCO, such as air conditioners, overlap with the products from Mitsubishi Heavy Industries partly because the companies share the same root.
 Air conditioning systems
 Room air conditioners (marketed as Mitsubishi Mr. Slim Room Air Conditioner and Mitsubishi Kirigamine)
 Package air conditioners (Marketed as Mitsubishi Mr. Slim Packaged Air Conditioner)
 Variable refrigerant flow (VRF) systems (marketed as Mitsubishi CITY MULTI)
 EcoCute (marketed as Ecodan or DIAHOT)
 Ventilators
 Air curtains
 Air conducting fan
 Home appliances
 Refrigerators and freezers
 Air purifiers, dehumidifiers
 Vacuum cleaners, electric fans
 Toasters
 Building systems
 Elevators, escalators
 Moving walks
 High-speed hand dryers (marketed as Mitsubishi Jet Towel)
 Information and communications systems
 Data transmission system solutions
 Saffron Type System, an anti-aliased text-rendering engine, developed by Mitsubishi Electric Research Laboratories (MERL)
 Optical access systems
 Satellite communications
 Factory automation systems
 Programmable controllers
 AC servo systems, inverters
 Industrial and collaborative robots, processing machines
 Energy systems
 Power generation systems
 ITER nuclear fusion reactor
 Photovoltaic panels
 Transmission and distribution systems
 Medium & low-voltage switchgear and systems
 Power information & communication technology
 Semiconductors and devices
 Power modules, high-power devices
 Driver ICs
 Sensors (Contact image sensors, etc)
 High-frequency devices
 optical devices
 TFT-LCD modules
 Transportation systems
 Rolling stock systems
 Power supply and electrification systems
 Transportation planning and control systems
 Communication systems
 Automotive equipment
 Charging and starting products
 Electrification products (Electric power steering system products, safety and driving assistance system products, etc.)
 Car multimedia products
 Visual information systems
 Large-scale LED displays
 Diamond Vision, large-scale video displays for sports venues and commercial applications
 Multimedia projectors
 Printers
 Space systems
 Satellite programs, platforms, and components
 Optical and radio telescopes
 Mobile Mapping System, a high-precision GPS mobile measurement system
 Public systems
 Applied superconductor systems
 Doppler lidar, radar systems
 Active electronically scanned array radar systems for the Mitsubishi F-2 fighter
 Uninterruptible power supply
 Water treatment systems, water pumps

Discontinued products 

 Mobile phones, from 1999 to 2008. Created for NTT Docomo. MELCO quit the mobile phone business in Apr 2008 after decrease in shipments. They estimated a temporary loss of 17 billion Yen in income before income taxes.
 Video Cassette Recorders known as the Mitsubishi Black Diamond VCR.
 Televisions
 Large-screen HDTVs. Competitors in the U.S market were Sony, Pioneer, Panasonic, JVC, Samsung (Akai), Daewoo, LG (Zenith), and Apex Digital.
 Direct-view CRT televisions, including the Diamondtron, until 2001. The last notable size in this field was a 40" (diagonal) tube size.
 LCD TVs, until 2008.
 DLP High Definition TVs, until December, 2012. MELCO then focused on professional and home theater DLP projection applications, and is no longer manufacturing televisions for the consumer market.
 Computer memory. Business unit spun off to be part of Elpida Memory.
 Computers, including MELCOM mainframe computers and MSX home computers.
 System LSIs. Business unit spun off to be part of Renesas Technology.
 Popular music. MELCO previously marketed popular music via record company Nippon Crown, which had been spun off from then-Nissan Group-owned Nippon Columbia on September 15, 1963. it was sold to Daiichi Kosho Company in July, 2001.
 Particle Beam Treatment System, until 2017. Business sold to Hitachi.

Global operations

 MELCO's business network around the world were the following:
Mitsubishi Electric Global
Mitsubishi Electric - North America
Canada
United States - Mitsubishi Electric United States
Mitsubishi Electric Asia-Pacific
Australia / New Zealand
China
Hong Kong
India
Taiwan
Vietnam
Japan
There are 11 facilities and 2 laboratories, for example, Kobe, Amagasaki and Kamakura.
Malaysia
Singapore
Thailand
Philippines 
 Saudi Arabia - Mitsubishi Electric Saudi Ltd. (MELSA)
Mitsubishi Electric Europe
Benelux
France
Germany
Ireland
Italy
Portugal
Russia
Spain
Sweden / Denmark
Finland / Norway
United Kingdom
Turkey

Slogans

Changes for the Better (since 2001)

Sports
Until September 2016, the company had a corporate team which is now known as the Nagoya Diamond Dolphins. Mitsubishi continues to sponsor the team.

Mitsubishi Electric signed a title sponsorship deal with the AFF Championship (renaming the competition as the AFF Mitsubishi Electric Cup) from the 2022 edition onwards.

See also

 List of elevator manufacturers

References

External links

 

 
Companies listed on the London Stock Exchange
Companies listed on the Tokyo Stock Exchange
Defense companies of Japan
Display technology companies
Electric transformer manufacturers
Electrical equipment manufacturers
Electronics companies established in 1921
Electronics companies of Japan
Home appliance brands
Home appliance manufacturers of Japan
Elevator manufacturers
Escalator manufacturers
Heating, ventilation, and air conditioning companies
Japanese brands
Japanese companies established in 1921
Mitsubishi companies
Mobile phone manufacturers
Robotics companies of Japan
Spacecraft manufacturers
Manufacturers of industrial automation
Electric motor manufacturers
Pump manufacturers
Engine manufacturers of Japan
Industrial robotics companies